Plestor House may refer to:
Plestor House, Selborne
Plestor House, Liss